The city of New Haven, Connecticut has many distinct neighborhoods. In addition to Downtown, centered on the central business district and the Green, are the following neighborhoods: the west central neighborhoods of Dixwell and Dwight; the southern neighborhoods of The Hill, historic water-front City Point (or Oyster Point), and the harborside district of Long Wharf; the western neighborhoods of Edgewood, West River, Westville, Amity, and West Rock; East Rock, Cedar Hill, Prospect Hill, and Newhallville in the northern side of town; the east central neighborhoods of Mill River and Wooster Square, an Italian-American neighborhood; Fair Haven, an immigrant community located between the Mill and Quinnipiac rivers; Quinnipiac Meadows and Fair Haven Heights across the Quinnipiac River; and facing the eastern side of the harbor, The Annex and East Shore (or Morris Cove).

List of neighborhoods
New Haven is made up of approximately 40 distinct neighborhoods, each listed below.
Amity
Annex
Audubon Arts District
Beaver Hills
Beverly Hills
Bishop Woods
Broadway District
Brookside
Cedar Hill
Chatham Square (Another name for the Northeast section of the Fair Haven neighborhood)
Church Street South
City Point/Oyster Point
Dixwell
Downtown New Haven(Central Business District)
Dwight
East Rock
East Shore/Morris Cove
Edgewood
Fair Haven
Fair Haven Heights
Hill
Jocelyn Square
Kimberly Square
Long Wharf
Mill River
Newhallville
New Haven Green (within the Downtown neighborhood)
Prospect Hill
Quinnipiac Meadows
Quinnipiac River Village
Trowbridge Square
Upper State Street
Westville
West Chapel District
West Hills
West River
West Rock
Whalley District
Wooster Square
Yale Main Campus
Yale Medical Campus

Historic districts
Numerous areas within the city are listed on the National Register of Historic Places or by the state of Connecticut as historic districts:
Beaver Hills Historic District
Chapel Street Historic District
Dwight Street Historic District
Edgewood Park Historic District
Elm Street Historic District
Fairlawn-Nettleton Historic District
Hillhouse Avenue Historic District
Howard Avenue Historic District
New Haven Green Historic District
Ninth Square Historic District
Orange Street Historic District
Oyster Point Historic District
Prospect Hill Historic District
Quinnipiac River Historic District
Redfield & West Streets Historic District
River Street Historic District
Trowbridge Square Historic District
Upper State Street Historic District
Westville Village Historic District
Whitney Avenue Historic District
Winchester Repeating Arms Company Historic District
Wooster Square Historic District

References

Neighborhoods in New Haven, Connecticut